In college football, the Black 41 Flash Reverse Pass is a play that the Nebraska Cornhuskers used against the Oklahoma Sooners and became one of the signature plays in quarterback Eric Crouch’s Heisman Trophy-winning season.

Background
When the teams met in Lincoln on October 27, 2001, the defending national champion Sooners were ranked No. 2 and the Cornhuskers were ranked No. 3. Crouch had led the Cornhuskers to an 8–0 start and was considered a contender for the 2001 Heisman trophy. His most notable highlight in the season thus far had been a scramble against Missouri that turned into a 95-yard touchdown run.

Nebraska had practiced the play a number of times in the week leading up to the game and according to Crouch it had gone poorly enough that it was taken out of the playbook before Saturday. However, the game between the longtime rivals was a hard-fought, defensive battle, with the Cornhuskers leading 13–10 as they went into the fourth quarter. With nine minutes left in regulation, the Cornhuskers took possession at their own four yard-line. They managed to move the ball to the 32-yard line before Crouch was stopped short of a first down on third-and-two. A facemask call against Oklahoma gave Nebraska a first down on its own 37 and Nebraska head coach Frank Solich called the Black 41 Flash Reverse Pass, much to the surprise of Crouch.

The play
The Cornhuskers lined up in a formation they had used twice already that ended with Crouch pitching the ball to I-back Thunder Collins for a run.  Familiar with the formation, Oklahoma’s safeties were baited to come forward to stop the run. This time, however, Crouch pitched the ball to Collins who then pitched a reverse to split end Mike Stuntz, a true freshman who had been a quarterback in high school but had seen limited playing time at Nebraska. Meanwhile, Crouch sprinted downfield to become a receiver as Stuntz threw him the ball. Crouch made the catch at the Oklahoma 40 and ran untouched to the end zone for a 63-yard touchdown.

Aftermath
Immediately after Crouch scored the touchdown, the jubilant Nebraska crowd watched as the video board displayed a computerized image of Crouch in the Heisman pose and a picture of the Heisman trophy itself. After Nebraska won 20–10, Crouch led the Cornhuskers to two more victories before the Colorado Buffaloes stunned Nebraska 62–36 the day after Thanksgiving. Nevertheless, Crouch became the first true option quarterback to win the Heisman trophy, edging out Florida’s Rex Grossman and Miami’s Ken Dorsey.

Nebraska controversially ended up No. 2 in the BCS Rankings, earning a bid to play for the national title in the 2002 Rose Bowl where they lost to the Miami Hurricanes 37–14.

Eric Crouch was drafted by the Rams after the season, but never played in an NFL game.  Stuntz saw limited playing time for the rest of his career at Nebraska.  He is now a successful doctor.

References

2001 Big 12 Conference football season
Nebraska Cornhuskers football games
Oklahoma Sooners football games
American football incidents
October 2001 sports events in the United States
Blue Nebraska